Monologue of Love, sometimes called Monologue about Love is the studio album by Soviet singer Sofia Rotaru, released in 1987 by Melodiya. The long play album was simultaneously released for the Soviet and international market. The album includes songs performed in Russian with new rock style arrangements by leading Soviet pop and rock bands: Vesyolye Rebyata, Forum, Chervona Ruta. This album is a soundtrack album to the movie Monologue of Love released in 1986.

Track listing

Side A

Side B

Album design
Art direction, cover design: M. Afanasiev
Photography: S. Borisov

References 

1987 albums
Sofia Rotaru albums